Ethical Culture Fieldston School (ECFS), also referred to as Fieldston, is a private independent school in New York City. The school is a member of the Ivy Preparatory School League. The school serves approximately 1,700 students with 480 faculty and staff. Joe Algrant is the Head of School.

The school consists of four divisions: Ethical Culture, Fieldston Lower, Fieldston Middle, and Fieldston Upper. Ethical Culture, located on the Upper West Side of Manhattan, and Fieldston Lower, located on the Fieldston campus in the Riverdale section of the Bronx, serve Pre-K through 5th grade. The two lower schools feed into Fieldston Middle (6th–8th grades) and Fieldston Upper (9th–12th grades)—also located on the Fieldston campus in Riverdale. Ethical Culture is headed by Principal Rob Cousins, Fieldston Lower is headed by Principal Joe McCauley, Fieldston Middle is headed by Principal Jonathan Alschuler, and Fieldston Upper is headed by Principal Stacey Bobo. Tuition and fees for ECFS were $55,510 for the 2020–2021 school year, and are increasing to $63,000 for the 2022-2023 school year.

History

The school opened in 1878 as a free kindergarten, founded by Felix Adler at the age of 24. In 1880, elementary grades were added, and the school was then called the Workingman's School. At that time, the idea that the children of the poor should be educated was innovative. By 1890 the school's academic reputation encouraged many more wealthy parents to seek it out, and the school was expanded to accommodate the upper-class as well, and began charging tuition; in 1895 the name changed to "The Ethical Culture School", and in 1903 the New York Society for Ethical Culture became its sponsor. Fieldston awards over $15 million in tuition-based financial aid to 22% of the student body.

The school moved into its Manhattan building at 33 Central Park West in 1904. The entire school was located in that building until 1928 when the high school division (Fieldston) moved to its 18-acre (73,000 m²) campus on Fieldston Road in the Fieldston section of Riverdale; the Manhattan branch of the Lower School remained there, and in 1932 a second Lower School was opened on the Riverdale campus. In 2007, a new middle school was opened on the same Riverdale campus, for the 6th, 7th, and 8th grades.

One of the early faculty members was American sociologist Lewis Hine.

In March 1970, about 60 students occupied the administration building in protest to demand that more black and Puerto Rican students be admitted to the school. They also aimed to have a greater number of minority courses, teachers, advisors, employees. The school agreed to some of the student demands.

Recent developments

Beginning in 2015, the school began separating children for mandatory weekly "affinity group" meetings based on their self-identified race, to discuss issues of race and bias. The experimental program met with controversy from Fieldston parents, many of whom compared the meetings to segregation.

In February 2019, a video that is believed to be created years previously was discovered by administrators after it was shared during a dispute between students. The students in the video use derogatory and racist language. Students involved who were still enrolled in the school were punished; however, some 100 students who thought the actions were not enough staged a sit-in reminiscent of the 1970 protest. The students presented the administrators with twenty demands that included increased racial bias training, more faculty of color, the recruitment of more students of color, and a required ethnic studies course; the students' demands were agreed to and are planned to be implemented over the course of 2–3 years.

The school also attracted attention in November 2019 after it hosted a guest speaker who compared the Israeli treatment of Palestinians to the Holocaust, a statement which was denounced by many as antisemitic, including two Reform Jewish rabbis who spoke at the school in the wake of the controversy and subsequently published a New York Times editorial about the incident. The school's response to the controversy was sharply criticized as being inadequate and itself antisemitic by many parents of Fieldston students. U.S. Congressmen Josh Gottheimer and Max Rose also wrote its administrators condemning the incident. In January 2020, the school fired a Jewish teacher who posted tweets opposing the invitation of two speakers on anti-Semitism because they were, according to him, "white" and Zionists. There were parents who asked for the teacher's reinstatement.

Academics
Fieldston dropped its participation in the Advanced Placement Program in 2002 to give its faculty the freedom to offer more innovative, challenging, and thought-provoking material. Students can take AP exams, but the school no longer officially sponsors such courses. While there was some concern that college admissions could be negatively affected, Fieldston's college office worked closely with admissions officers of schools across the country to explain the change and to assure that its students would be evaluated on the quality of its courses, even without the AP designation.

Athletics

Fieldston's athletic program includes 62 teams covering 23 sports. The teams, known as the "Fieldston Eagles," play in the Ivy Preparatory School League against other private schools in the region. The school's hockey team as well as the girls and boys ultimate frisbee teams, however, do not play in the league and schedule their own games. Fieldston's most recent athletic title was the NYSAIS Girls Soccer tournament in 2021.

Special programs
Before School and After School – at the two Lower schools, and after school in the Middle School
Fieldston Enrichment Program (FEP) – tutoring program for selected public school students in preparation of public and private high school entrance exams and requirements
Young Dancemakers Company – summer dance program
City Semester – an interdisciplinary experiential-education based semester program focusing on New York City
STS (Students Teaching Students) – a specialized ethics program in which Form V & Form VI students (juniors and seniors) teach middle school students. This curriculum covers a wide range of topics including community norms, relationships, decision-making, navigating choices encountered in middle and high school situations (e.g., around social media, sex, drugs, alcohol, and bullying).
Bridge to Bridge - a mentoring program for students of color in the upper school to mentor middle schoolers of color.

Peer schools
Ethical Culture Fieldston is a part of the Ivy Preparatory School League, with many of New York City's elite private schools. The three high schools Fieldston, Riverdale, and Horace Mann together are known as the "Hill schools," as all three are located within a short walking distance of each other in the Riverdale section of the Bronx, on a hilly area above Van Cortlandt Park. The three are also involved in inter-school sports rivalry.

Notable alumni and former students

Among its many notable alumni and former students are:

A. G. Sulzberger – the chairman of The New York Times Company and the publisher of The New York Times
Jill Abramson – former executive editor of The New York Times
Clifford Alexander Jr. – former Secretary of the Army
George J. Ames - former Lazard executive
Joseph Amiel – author
Diane Arbus – photographer
Leon Black – financier, Apollo Management and Drexel Burnham Lambert
Richard D. Brown – historian of colonial and revolutionary-era America; professor emeritus at the University of Connecticut
Nancy Cantor – chancellor, Syracuse University
Roy Cohn – attorney
Sofia Coppola – Oscar-winning writer/director (attended middle school at Fieldston)
Andrew Delbanco – critic and author. Director, American studies, Columbia University
Nicholas Delbanco – novelist
David Denby – film critic, The New Yorker
Ralph de Toledano – author
Glen de Vries – American entrepreneur in the field of medical science and pharmacology 
Joseph Leo Doob – mathematician
Douglas Durst – real estate magnate
John Friedman – film producer, Hotel Terminus, winner of 1988 Academy Award for Best Documentary Feature
Rita Gam – film actress
Jim Gardner – longtime WPVI-TV news anchor
Alan Gilbert – music director of the New York Philharmonic
Ailes Gilmour – dancer
Leonie Gilmour – educator and writer
Rob Glaser – internet pioneer
Matt Goldman, performance artist. Co-founder, Blue Man Group
Maggie Haberman – The New York Times political reporter
Judith Lewis Herman— psychiatrist
Susie Linfield - author, critic, editor and NYU Professor
Charles Herman-Wurmfeld – film director
Robert Jervis – political scientist. Adlai E. Stevenson Professor, Columbia University
Elizabeth Jonas (neurologist) – physician, neuroscientist, and professor, Yale School of Medicine
Rodney Jones – jazz guitarist
Jeffrey Katzenberg – film producer, media mogul
Yosuke Kawasaki – violinist
Sinah Estelle Kelley – chemist
William Melvin Kelley – author (A Different Drummer, Dunfords Travels Everywhere)
Charlie King – New York civic leader and politician
Arthur Kinoy – civil rights lawyer
Ernest Kinoy – screenwriter
Walter Koenig – actor
Joseph Kraft – public affairs columnist
Louise Lasser – actress
Christopher Lehmann-Haupt – author, The New York Times book reviewer
Sean Ono Lennon – musician (did not graduate from Fieldston)
Eda LeShan – child psychologist and author
Carl P. Leubsdorf – Washington bureau chief, Dallas Morning News
Doug Liman – film director (Bourne Identity, Mr. & Mrs. Smith)
Andrew Litton – conductor, New York City Ballet
Beulah Livingstone – motion picture publicist
Douglas Lowenstein – president and CEO of Private Equity Council, founder and former president of Entertainment Software Association
Douglas Lowy – cancer biologist; director of U.S. National Cancer Institute
Staughton Lynd – peace activist and civil rights activist
Jeffrey Lyons – film critic, WNBC-TV, New York City
Mark A. Michaels- author and sexuality educator
Bob Marshall – conservationist, writer, and the founder of The Wilderness Society
Andy Marvel – award-winning musician
Grace M. Mayer – curator at The Museum of the City of New York and The Museum of Modern Art
Jane Mayer – best selling author, investigative journalist, The New Yorker
Zach McGowan - actor
Marguerita Mergentime – industrial designer
Nicholas Meyer – film director
Jo Mielziner – stage designer
Olivette Miller – jazz harpist
Marvin Minsky – pioneer in artificial intelligence at MIT
Tim Minton – television journalist and media executive
Alfred Mirsky – cell biologist
Jeannette Mirsky – writer
Frederic S. Mishkin – governor of the Federal Reserve Board
Robert M. Morgenthau – retired New York County District Attorney
Howard Nemerov – former United States Poet Laureate
Gabriel Olds – actor, writer
J. Robert Oppenheimer – physicist, Scientific Director of the Manhattan Project, "Father of the Atomic Bomb"
Eleanor Pepper – architect, interior designer
Emanuel R. Piore – chief scientist of IBM, and electrical engineering pioneer
Belva Plain – author
Susan Poser - President of Hofstra University
Letty Cottin Pogrebin – author
Edward R. Pressman – film producer
Richard Ravitch – business and civic leader
Nancy Reiner - graduating as Nancy Russek, cover artist of Jimi Hendrix album The Cry of Love (1971), among others
Menachem Z. Rosensaft – attorney and founding chairman of the International Network of Children of Jewish Survivors
Dan Rottenberg — journalist and author
Muriel Rukeyser – poet and playwright
David Sarasohn – associate editor and syndicated columnist for The Oregonian newspaper
James H. Scheuer – US Congressman (NY)
Gil Scott-Heron – musician
Nicole Seligman – lawyer, Sony executive
Cynthia Propper Seton – novelist
Robert B. Sherman – composer, lyricist, screenwriter, painter
Stephen Slesinger – creator of the Red Ryder comic strip
Tess Slesinger – author/screenwriter
Jay Smooth – radio host and cultural commentator
Donald J. Sobol – author of juvenile short stories; creator of Encyclopedia Brown
Stephen Sondheim – composer; attended the Fieldston Lower School
Dan Squadron – New York State Senator
Andy Stein – musician
Stewart Stern – screenwriter
Paul Strand – photographer and filmmaker
James Toback – filmmaker
Richard Tofel – journalist, attorney, administrator, non fiction writer
Doris Ulmann – photographer of Appalachia
Laurence Urdang – lexicographer, dictionary editor
Helen Valentine – founder of Seventeen magazine
Elliot Villar – actor
Barbara Walters – TV news
Andrew Weisblum – Oscar-nominated film editor
Chris Wink, performance artist; co-founder, Blue Man Group
Howard Wolfson – deputy mayor of New York City
Jane C. Wright – oncologist
Keith L. T. Wright – New York State Assemblyman
Sheryl WuDunn – investment banker, Pulitzer Prize-winning journalist
Adam Yarmolinsky – academic and author who served in the Kennedy, Johnson and Carter administrations
Eli Zabar – New York City restaurateur
Lynn Zelevansky - contemporary art curator and Carnegie Museum of Art director

See also
Education in New York City

References

External links

Ethical Culture Fieldston School records at New-York Historical Society

Central Park West Historic District
Educational institutions established in 1878
 
Ethical movement
Ivy Preparatory School League
Private high schools in the Bronx
Private middle schools in the Bronx
Private elementary schools in the Bronx
Private K-12 schools in New York City
Private elementary schools in Manhattan
Preparatory schools in New York City
Riverdale, Bronx
Upper West Side
1878 establishments in New York (state)